Baldassare Cenci, iuniore (1710–1763) was a Roman Catholic cardinal.

Biography
Baldassare Cenci was born on November 1, 1710, in Rome, the fifth of seven children born to Tiberio Cenci and Eleonora Maddalena Costaguti. His uncle is cardinal Baldassare Cenci (seniore).

Cenci died of apoplexy on March 2, 1763, in Nettuno, Italy.

References

1710 births
1763 deaths
18th-century Italian cardinals
Clergy from Rome